The Praxis Business School  is a post-graduate school of management, on Bakrahat Road, Rasapunja, on the southern outskirts of Kolkata, in the state of West Bengal, India. It was established in 2007 and offers a two-year fully- residential AICTE Approved Post Graduate Diploma in Management and a one-year full-time course in Data Science.

References 

Business schools in Kolkata
Educational institutions established in 2007
2007 establishments in West Bengal